The Canadian Journal of Plant Science (French: Revue canadienne de phytotechnie) is a Canadian peer-reviewed scientific journal which covers botanical research relevant to continental climate agriculture. It was established in 1957.

References

External links

Canadian Science Publishing academic journals
Botany_journals
Multilingual_journals
1957 establishments in Canada
Bimonthly journals